Banjul International Airport, also known as Yundum International , is the international airport of Banjul, capital of Gambia, built during World War II.

History 
The only airport in Gambia is at Yundum. After World War II, Yundum airport was used for passenger flights. Both British South American Airways and the British Overseas Airways Corporation had services, the former moving its service to Dakar, which had a concrete runway (as opposed to pierced steel planking). The airport was rebuilt in 1963 and the building is still in use today.

In February 2001, Ghana Airways commenced a flight from Banjul to Baltimore, which originated in Accra. Cooperation among Ghana Airways, Gambia International Airlines, and the Ghanaian and Gambian governments gave rise to the service. In June 2006, North American Airlines inaugurated a link to Baltimore using Boeing 767s, but it lasted only seven months.

Overview
The head office of the Gambia Civil Aviation Authority is located on the airport property.

In the event of an emergency on any of the NASA Space Shuttles, Banjul International Airport had been selected as an augmented landing site.  Gambia was the perfect location when the shuttle was launched with a low, 28-degree inclination.  In 2001 NASA announced that Banjul airport would no longer be used as an augmented landing site because future shuttle launches would take place at inclinations of up at 51.6 degrees to reach the International Space Station, making air bases in Spain and France more suitable for an emergency landing.

The airport was the main hub of Gambia Bird until the airline ceased operations in late 2014.

Airlines and destinations

Accidents and incidents
 On 4 July 1946, a Bristol Freighter 170 with registration G-AHJB, flying from Bathurst (now Banjul) to Natal on a delivery flight to Argentina, experienced a fuel shortage that forced the crew to ditch the plane. The crewmembers were rescued by an American Steamer. The probable cause was powerplant failure resulting from shortage of fuel due to faulty navigation. No one died in the accident.
 On 7 September 1946, a British South American Airways Avro 685 York I with registration G-AHEW, named "Star Leader", flying from London to Buenos Aires via Lisbon, Bathurst (Banjul)-Jeshwang, Natal, Rio de Janeiro-Santos Dumont and Montevideo, lost control and crashed shortly after takeoff from Bathurst. The cause of the loss of control cannot be determined with certainty, but a mishandling of the controls by the captain is the most likely explanation. All 24 occupants died.
 On 10 October 1997, a Beechcraft 200 Super King Air operated by NAYSA Aerotaxis crashed on approach 3 miles before the runway. All but one of the ten occupants died.

See also 
 List of airports in the Gambia

References

External links 
 Profile of Banjul International Airport
 
 
 

Airports in the Gambia
Space Shuttle Emergency Landing Sites